Little Zaches Called Cinnabar is a 1819 satirical fairytale fantasy novella by E. T. A. Hoffmann.

Plot summary

Out of pity the good fairy Rosabelverde, bewitches the ugly little child Zaches who resembles a mandrake, with an ugly body and soul, so that most people, mostly philistines, stop seeing him as unsightly.  Now people are drawn to him and any praiseworthy deed performed in his presence is attributed to him. Zaches changes his name to a new one — Cinnaber.  And vice versa, as soon as he does something disgusting or shameful (and he does nothing else) - in the eyes of those present, someone else seems to have done an abomination;  most often the one who suffered the most from Cinnaber's antics.  Thanks to the gift of the good fairy, the dwarf enchants Professor Mosh Terpin (possessed by a peculiar vision of the "German Spirit") and his daughter Candida.  Only the melancholic student Balthazar, who is in love with a beautiful girl, sees the true appearance of the villain.  Artists also have this ability (violinist Sbiocca, singer Bragazzi), as well as foreigners.  Later they are joined by Balthazar's friends: Fabian and Pulcher.  Zaches-Cinnaber does not waste time, and, taking advantage of other people's successes, quickly makes a career at the court of the local prince Paphnutius and prepares to marry Candida.

Poet-student Balthazar, who turns to the familiar magician Prosper Alpanus for help, learns from him the secret of Cinnaber's power: he pulls out three fiery hairs from the dwarf's head, from which all his magical power is derived.  People see who their minister truly is.  The exposed and humiliated Zaches has no choice but to hide in his beautiful palace, but ends up drowning there in a chamber pot with sewage.

Characters 

  'Little Zaches, nicknamed Cinnaber'  is the son of a poor peasant woman, gifted by the fairy Rosabelverde with the magical power of attracting people to himself and taking other people's merits.
 Balthazar - a student at Kerepes University
 Fabian - Balthazar's friend and fellow student. 
 Mosh Terpin - a professor of natural sciences at Kerepes University, whose lectures Balthazar attends.
 Candida - the daughter of Mosh Terpin and the beloved of Balthazar.
 Fairy Rosabelverde - a fairy who bewitches Little Zaches.
 Prosper Alpanus - a wandering magician.
 Paphnutii - a prince obsessed with the introduction of enlightenment in his land
 Liese - Zaches' mother, a poor peasant woman.

Origin
According to the questionable information from Hoffmann's friend Julius Hitzig, the author of Little Zaches was stimulated by fever visions that plagued him during a severe liver and nerve ailment in the spring of 1819. In reality, Hoffmann fell ill in the spring of 1818 and was already working on the fairy tale at the end of 1818. On January 24, 1819, he sent Prince Pückler-Muskau an author's copy corrected by himself; the story, “the birth of a somewhat exuberant ironic fantasy”, has just left the printing press. The work was published by the Berlin publishing house F. Dümmler.

Impact
Very soon after the story was published critical pieces detailed the literary models that Little Zaches supposedly relied on. Hoffmann was not very surprised “when he came across a review in which [...] every source was carefully mentioned from which the author is said to have drawn inspiration. The latter was of course pleasant to him insofar as it gave him an opportunity to examine these sources himself and enrich his knowledge. "

The literary response to Little Zaches was mixed. Some critics did not appreciate that moral and theological reflections were voiced against a mingling of the supernatural with an almost carnival-like cheerfulness. The story received recognition in extensive reviews, for example in the weekly literary newspaper and in the Heidelberg yearbooks.

The figure of Little Zaches was spread particularly through its portrayal in the 1881 Jacques Offenbach's opera The Tales of Hoffmann, where Hoffmann sings the famous song by Little Zaches: "Once upon a time at Eisenack's court ..." The Russian composer Nikolai Karetnikov made a ballet adaptation.

The Berlin band Coppelius composed the world's first steampunk opera based on the novel, which premiered on November 14, 2015 at the Gelsenkirchen Music Theater.

When Uwe Tellkamp was asked what kind of community the German Democratic Republic was, she recalled E.T.A. Hoffmann's description of the fictional principality in the fairy tale Little Zaches: “What was the GDR? [...] A [...] snail shell of the ludi magister of the E.T.A. Hoffmann University of Kerepes ”. Shortly thereafter, Tellkamp judged: “Father of all best literature on the problem [GDR] is, in my opinion, E.T.A. Hoffmann, with whom the (bad) dreams creep into reality.

Popular Culture
 The character of Little Zaches was used to parody Vladimir Putin in the NTV show Puppets. The role of the fairy was assigned to the owner of ORT Boris Berezovsky.
 The story was adapted in the 2018 Russian film Hoffmaniada.

References

External links 
 The full text at Zeno.org (in German)
 The full text at Project Gutenberg (in German)

1819 German novels
Novels by E. T. A. Hoffmann